Tsarevich Dmitry Alexeyevich (22 August 1648 – 6 October 1649) was the first son and heir of Tsar Alexis of Russia and Maria Miloslavskaya, brother of Tsarevich Alexei Alexeyevich of Russia, Tsar Feodor III of Russia and Tsar Ivan V of Russia and half-brother of Tsar Peter the Great. He died in infancy at the age of nine months, some 26 years before the death of his father.  He is buried in the Cathedral of the Archangel.

1648 births
1649 deaths
Heirs apparent who never acceded
Russian tsareviches
House of Romanov
17th-century Russian people
Children of Alexis of Russia

Royalty and nobility who died as children